Cartel de Santa is a Mexican rap group from Santa Catarina, Nuevo León, Mexico, founded by Hector Montaño and Ronaldo Sifuentes. The band started playing in 1999 as part of the Avanzada Regia musical movement and Artilleria Pesada. Currently composed by Eduardo Davalos de Luna, also known as MC Babo or Babo (lead vocals),  Rowan Rabia (beatmaker) and DJ Agustín (only in live shows). They have been referred to as one of the most notable Mexican hip-hop groups.

History

Cartel de Santa started playing in 1996, when MC Babo and some friends began singing improvised rap songs.

The group became famous in 2003, when the band released its first self-titled album. The album includes hits such as "Perros", "Todas Mueren por Mí" and "La Pelotona". The album was produced by Jason Roberts who had previously worked with artists such as Cypress Hill, Ice Cube, House of Pain, Guns N' Roses, Control Machete, and Plastilina Mosh. This contributed to the fame of the band.

That same year, the group released a video clip of the song "Perros". This video was broadcast across Latin America on MTV.

A year later, in 2004, a new album was released, Vol. 2, which included hits as "Blah, blah, blah", "La Llamada" and "El Arte del Engaño". Cartel de Santa Vol. 2 counted with the collaboration of other artists, such as Tego Calderón, in "Conexión Puerto Rico", and Mr. Pomel, in "Crónica Babilonia".

In 2007, Cartel de Santa recorded its third album, named Volumen Prohibido. It included the single "Cheka Wey" featuring female hip-hop artist Mery Dee. A few months after the album release, the lead vocalist, Babo, was arrested for the killing of a fellow band member. During a confrontation with Juan Miguel Chávez, an old rival, on the street, Babo shot a warning shot, which instead hit former band member Ulises. Eduardo Dávalos, Babo, turned himself in to the Ministerial Police of Nuevo Leon state. He later wrote a song about the incident while in prison in which he expresses his regret over the killing of Ulises. The band released a compilation album, Cartel de Santa, Greatest Hits, aimed at raising funds to be used to set the vocalist free. MC Babo was liberated from prison nine months later, with help of Sony Music, after the group paid about 130,000 pesos as bail.

In February 2008, the band released its fourth album, Vol. IV. Some of the songs recount Babo's memories during the months he was in prison. The album was meant as a message to fans that "el Cartel" would keep making music. The first single of this album was "Hay mamita" which also has a music videoclip.

In March 2010, Babo announced on the band's Myspace the release of another album. The fifth album was released in May 2010 with the name "Vol. V: Sincopa". Like their last work, Volume V showed a better sound and beats quality. Cartel de Santa was nominated for the Latin Grammys as a result of their new release.

The group's sixth album, "Golpe Avisa" was released on August 5, 2014, by Sony Music Entertainment. This work is the group's first studio album released after the departure of rapper MC Dharius. "Golpe Avisa" features collaborations with Campa, Draw, Big Man and Millionaire. The song "Me alegro de su odio" had originally been released with vocal work from then group member Dharius in June 2013. However, after the rapper's decision to leave the group, this subject had to be re-recorded to include it in the album. This reissued theme was never released as a single.

On 3 October 2016 Cartel released their seventh album "Viejo Marihuano", with the singles "Mucha Marihuana" and "Soy Quien soy". It was published by Babilonia Music, S.A. De C.V. In 2017, Cartel received a gold record in Mexico for reaching 100,000 sales of Viejo Marihuano.

Controversy

In April 2007, MC Babo turned himself in to Mexican police officials claiming that he accidentally shot and killed his fellow band member. While at a house in Santa Catarina, Nuevo León, MC Babo learned that a formal rival was headed to the home to settle a dispute. He then proceeded to shoot Juan Miguel Chavez Pimentel, known as El Micky, in the leg upon his arrival. Babo claimed that one of the shots from his .38 revolver ricocheted off of the floor and hit his friend Ulises 'Buenrostro', killing him. In January 2008, Babo was released from jail after nine months incarceration, after the group paid a bail of about 130,000 pesos.

In May 2018, nude photographs of MC Babo were published on the internet.

Discography

2002: Cartel de Santa (BMG)
2004: Vol. II (BMG)
2006: Volumen ProIIIbido (Sony BMG)
2008: Vol. IV (Sony BMG)
2010: Sincopa (Sony Music)
2014: Golpe Avisa (Babilonia Records)
2016: Viejo Marihuano (Babilonia Records)
2023: Piensa en Mi (Babilonia Records )

References

External links

[ Allmusic]

Mexican hip hop groups
Musical groups from Nuevo León
Musical groups established in 1999